John Denham may refer to:

 John Denham (died 1556 or later), English MP for Shaftesbury
 John Denham (judge), (1559–1639), father of the poet below, and one of the Ship Money judges
 John Denham (poet) (1615–1669), English poet
 John Denham (politician) (born 1953), British Member of Parliament for Southampton Itchen, 1992–2015, subsequently an academic
 John 'Abs' Denham, a fictional nurse in the UK television drama Casualty

See also
 
 Jack Denham, Australian horse trainer and businessman